Genowefa Wiśniowska (born 4 March 1949, Ożary, Poland) is a Polish politician.

She was elected to the Sejm on 25 September 2005, getting 10,670 votes in 24 Białystok district as a candidate from the Samoobrona Rzeczpospolitej Polskiej list. She was Vice Marshal of the Sejm from 2005 to 2007. She was also a member of Sejm 2001-2005, and served as a Member of the European Parliament in 2004.

See also
Members of Polish Sejm 2005-2007

External links
Genowefa Wiśniowska - parliamentary page - includes declarations of interest, voting record, and transcripts of speeches.

1949 births
Living people
People from Ząbkowice Śląskie County
PAX Association members
Self-Defence of the Republic of Poland politicians
Deputy Marshals of the Sejm of the Third Polish Republic
Members of the Polish Sejm 2001–2005
Members of the Polish Sejm 2005–2007
Self-Defence of the Republic of Poland MEPs
MEPs for Poland 2004
Women MEPs for Poland
Women members of the Sejm of the Republic of Poland
20th-century Polish women